Claude Askolovitch (born 18 December 1962) is a French journalist and author.

Early life
Claude Askolovitch was born on 18 December 1962 in Paris. He earned a bachelor's degree in economics from Paris Dauphine University and a postgraduate degree from the Centre de formation des journalistes.

Career
Askolovitch began his career at RFO. He later worked for Le Matin de Paris and Le Sport, until he joined Europe 1.  He became a journalist for L'Événement du jeudi in 1992. By 1999, he was a journalist for Marianne. He was a correspondent for L'Obs from 2001 to 2008. He became the editor-in-chief of Le Journal du Dimanche in 2008.

Askolovitch is the author of several books. He won the 1999 Prix Décembre for Voyage au bout de la France: Le Front National tel qu'il est.

Works

References

1962 births
Living people
Journalists from Paris
Paris Dauphine University alumni
French male journalists
French male non-fiction writers
20th-century French Jews